The 2022 GCC Games was the third edition of multi-sport event for the Gulf Cooperation Council (GCC) countries. It was held in Kuwait, from 16 to 31 May 2022. A total of more than 1,500 athletes and 500 officials participated in 16 sports. Female athletes competed for the first time at the GCC Games in this edition. The six sports involving female athletes are athletics, basketball (3×3), cycling, futsal, esports, and padel.

Background
The Games were originally scheduled to take place from 3 to 14 April 2020, but due to the COVID-19 pandemic, on 3 March 2020, the event was postponed. It was then postponed multiple times due to the COVID-19 pandemic.

Sports
16 sports were contested in this edition of GCC Games.

Futsal
http://www.futsalplanet.com/news.aspx?id=799&pa=1

http://www.futsalplanet.com/news.aspx?id=792&pa=2

Men
16/05/2022	Bahrain	Saudi Arabia	1	3	

16/05/2022	UAE	Kuwait	0	3	

18/05/2022	UAE	Oman	1	2	

18/05/2022	Saudi Arabia	Kuwait	2	3	

20/05/2022	Bahrain	Oman	2	0	

20/05/2022	UAE	Saudi Arabia	5	2	

22/05/2022	Saudi Arabia	Oman	3	0	

22/05/2022	Kuwait	Bahrain	2	1	

24/05/2022	UAE	Bahrain	1	4	

24/05/2022	Kuwait	Oman	3	1

1. Kuwait ----------------------4-4-0-0-11–4-12

2. Saudi Arabia ----------------4-2-0-2-10–9-6

3. Bahrain ---------------------4-2-0-2--8--6-6

4. Oman ------------------------4-1-0-3--3--9-3

5. UAE -------------------------4-1-0-3--7-11-3

Women

16/5/2022

14.00 Saudi Arabia vs Bahrain 1-4 (1-2)

19.00 UAE vs Kuwait 1-1 (1-1)

18/5/2022

16.30 Bahrain vs UAE 4-1 (3-0)

19.00 Saudi Arabia vs Kuwait 2-1 (2-0)

19/5/2022

17.00 UAE vs Saudi Arabia 1-2 (0-1)

19.30 Bahrain vs Kuwait 2-1 (0-1)

Standing

1. Bahrain ---------------------3-3-0-0-10–3-9

2. Saudi Arabia ----------------3-2-0-1--5--6-6

3. Kuwait ----------------------3-0-1-2--3--5-1

4. UAE -------------------------3-0-1-2--3--7-1

Semi-Finals

21/5/2022

17.00 Bahrain vs UAE 5-3 (3-3)

19.30 Saudi Arabia vs Kuwait 1-3 ps; 3-3 aet; 2-2 (0-1)

Finals

24/5/2022

3rd/4th Place Match

13.00 UAE vs Saudi Arabia 1-4 (0-1)

1st/2nd Place Match

17.00 Bahrain vs Kuwait 2-1 (2-0)

Medal standings

References

External links
Organising Committee's official website

GCC Games
GCC Games
Multi-sport events in Kuwait
GCC Games
Gulf Cooperation Council
GCC Games
GCC Games